Christopher Puckett (born June 11, 1970 in Wheat Ridge, Colorado) is a former American alpine skier who competed in the men's giant slalom at the 1992 Winter Olympics.

He is the brother of Olympian Casey Puckett.

External links
 sports-reference.com
 

1970 births
Living people
American male alpine skiers
Olympic alpine skiers of the United States
Alpine skiers at the 1992 Winter Olympics
People from Wheat Ridge, Colorado